P. Paiwang Konyak is an Indian politician and member of the Bharatiya Janata Party. He is the Minister of Transport, Civil Aviation and Railways, Land Resource in Fourth Rio ministry .Konyak is a member of the Nagaland Legislative Assembly from the Tizit constituency in Mon district.

References 

People from Mon district
Bharatiya Janata Party politicians from Nagaland
Nagaland MLAs 2013–2018
Living people
21st-century Indian politicians
Year of birth missing (living people)